Salvia summa, the great sage or supreme sage, is a herbaceous perennial plant that is native to a small area in southern New Mexico, an adjacent area in northern Texas, and in Chihuahua, Mexico. The plant grows on limestone cliffs in part shade at  elevation.

It is somewhat similar to Salvia henryi, which has red flowers and a shorter lower lip, and which grows in the same habitat.

Notes

External links
 IPNI Listing
 USDA Plant Profile
 Kew Plant List

summa